Borger Breeveld (born 20 July 1944) is a Surinamese actor and journalist. He is the media manager at the Surinam Television Foundation (STVS) and founder of Film Institute Paramaribo.

In the Surinamese-Dutch film Wan Pipel (1976), Breeveld starred as Roy Ferrol. In the 1980s, Breeveld was spokesman of Dési Bouterse. Together with Arie Verkuijl and Pim de la Parra, Breeveld established the Film Institute Paramaribo (FIP). He is the secretary of the foundation Surinamese Film Academy. In STVS, Breeveld operates as a television director which include current affairs program Mmanten Taki.

In December 2012, he starred, like his brothers Carl, Hans and Clarence and his sister Lucia, in the documentary Wan Famiri of the Dutch documentarian Geertjan Lassche. The family, however, has distanced itself from the end result. The focus would be on the December murders and Borger's friendly relations with main suspect Desi Bouterse, instead of the Breeveld family.

References

1944 births
Living people
Surinamese male actors
Surinamese journalists